Electric Samurai (The Noble Savage) is a 2004 album by Tomoyasu Hotei.  In addition to a few original tracks, the album includes much of Hotei's work for the soundtracks of the films Samurai Fiction and New Battles Without Honor and Humanity (Another Battle). The three versions of "Battle Without Honor or Humanity" included were originally used on the soundtrack of the latter, although the original version was prominently featured in Quentin Tarantino's Kill Bill.

Track listing
All tracks by Tomoyasu Hotei, except where noted

 "Battle Without Honor or Humanity" – 2:29
 "Katana Groove" – 4:12
 "Jingi" – 1:58
 "Kill The Target" – 2:52
 "Immigrant Song" (Page, Plant) – 2:53
 "Battle Without Honor or Humanity #2" – 1:35
 "Frozen Memories" – 4:01
 "Believe Me, I'm A Liar" (Hotei, Price) – 4:15
 "Battle Without Honor or Humanity #3" (Hotei) – 2:31
 "Dark Wind" – 2:48
 "Space Cowboy" – 2:32
 "Metropolis" (Hotei, Fujii) – 3:46
 "Howling" – 5:34
 "Fetish" – 4:21

Personnel 

Zachary Alford – drums (tracks: 5, 14) 
Toshio Arai – trumpet
Dave Bishop  – saxophone (track: 14)
Takeshi Fujii – programming
Simon Gardner – trumpet, flugelhorn
Mike Garson – piano (track: 14)
Itaru Hirama – photography
Satoshi Hirose – A&R assistance
Tomoyasu Hotei – bass, guitar, drums, keyboards, vocals, liner notes
Yoshifumi Iio – engineer, mixing
Kunihiko Imai – engineer, mixing
Tomio Inoue – bass
Senji Kasuya  – executive producer
Kazumi Kurigami – cover photo 
Kyoko Matsuda – translation
Yoichi Murata  – trombone, horn arrangements (tracks: 1,3, 14)
Jeff Patterson – backing vocals
Darren Price – programming, engineer, mixing
Masaaki Saito – executive producer
Ken Shima – string arrangements
Steve Sidwell – trumpet, flugelhorn
Masahiko Sugasaka – trumpet
Shoji Uchida – photography
Steve Walters  – bass (track: 14)
Hideo Yamaki – drums
Michael Zimmerling – engineer, mixing

Credits
 Edited by – Toshiyuki Kishi  (tracks: 1, 3, 4, 6, 7, 9, 13, 14) 
 Producer – Tomoyasu Hotei 
 Programmed by – Nobutaka Watanabe (tracks: 2, 5), Takeshi Fujii (tracks: 2, 10, 12), Toshiyuki Kishi (tracks: 1, 3, 4, 6, 7, 9, 13, 14) 
 Recorded and Mixed by – Kunihiko Imai  (tracks: 1 to 3, 5 to 11, 13, 14), Michael Zimmerling (track: 12) 
 Mastering Engineer – Ian Cooper

References

Tomoyasu Hotei albums
2004 albums